Conflict escalation is the process by which conflicts grow in severity or scale over time. That may refer to conflicts between individuals or groups in interpersonal relationships, or it may refer to the escalation of hostilities in a political or military context. In systems theory, the process of conflict escalation is modeled by positive feedback.

While the word escalation was used as early as in 1938, it was popularized during the Cold War by two  important books: On Escalation (Herman Kahn, 1965) and Escalation and the Nuclear Option (Bernard Brodie, 1966). In those contexts, it especially referred to war between two major states with weapons of mass destruction during the Cold War.

Conflict escalation has a tactical role in military conflict and is often formalized with explicit rules of engagement. Highly-successful military tactics exploit a particular form of conflict escalation such as by controlling an opponent's reaction time, which allows the tactician to pursue or trap his opponent. Both Napoleon Bonaparte and Heinz Guderian advocated that approach. Sun Tzu elaborated it in a more abstract form and maintained that military strategy was about minimizing escalation and diplomacy was about eliminating it.

Continuum of force

The United States Marine Corps' "Continuum of Force" (found in MCRP 3-02B) documents the stages of conflict escalation in combat for a typical subject:

Level 1: Compliant (cooperative)
The subject responds to and obeys verbal commands. He refrains from close combat.

Level 2: Resistant (passive)
The subject resists verbal commands but complies to commands immediately upon contact controls. He refrains from close combat.

Level 3: Resistant (active)
Initially, the subject physically resists commands, but he can be made to comply by compliance techniques, including come-along holds, soft-handed stunning blows, and techniques inducing pain by joint manipulation and pressure points.

Level 4: Assaultive (bodily harm)
The unarmed subject physically attacks his opponent. He can be controlled by certain defensive tactics, including blocks, strikes, kicks, enhanced pain compliance procedures, impact weapon blocks, and blows.

Level 5: Assaultive (lethal force)
The subject has a weapon and will likely kill or injure someone unless he is controlled. That is possible only by lethal force, which possibly requires firearms or weapons. This could also include the subject physically overpowering someone and choking them out, which will cause injury or death if sustained for a long period of time.

Prevention
A major focus of peace and conflict theory is concerned with curbing conflict escalation or creating a mindset to avoid such conflict in future and instead to engage in peacemaking. Much nonviolent conflict resolution, however, involves conflict escalation in the form of protests, strikes, or other direct actions.

Mohandas Gandhi, a major proponent of nonviolence, used satyagraha to demonstrate the following:
Peacefully controlling a group of people with a common cause was possible.
One could accomplish objectives through solidarity without capitulating to violent attack.
His method ensured mutual support.
It was possible to desist from retributive justice.
It was not ultimately desirable to inflict punishment, even when  one was grievously wronged.

With that method of escalation, Gandhi avoided technological escalation and demonstrated to those in power the following:
 The group was held together by its own discipline and not by any kind of authority using violence.
 Authority could surrender without being subjected to violence.
 Authority could depart safely.
 Authority could devolve without obstacles since the dissent was well enough organized to constitute an effective political party.

Systems view
Carol Moore, a later theorist, examined and described Gandhi's methods from the perspective of systems theory. Jay Forrester and Donella Meadows observed that people in crisis would often push the twelve leverage points towards escalation in the first stage and then reduce escalation when the resistance had weakened, and it was impossible to maintain the status quo.

See also
 Conflict management
 Friedrich Glasl's model of conflict escalation
 De-escalation
 Escalation of commitment

References

Conflict (process)